The Hardest Deal of All: The Battle Over School Integration in Mississippi, 1870-1980 is a non-fiction book by Charles C. Bolton, published in 2005 by the University Press of Mississippi.

Background
Documents from the Mississippi State Sovereignty Commission and oral histories were used as sources.

Contents
The book presents information by historic sequence.

The establishment of a segregated schooling system in Mississippi is detailed in the first chapter. The white community's opposition to Brown v. Board of Education is detailed in the midpoint of the book.

Reception
Hassan Kwame Jeffries of Ohio State University wrote that the work "succeeds in" explaining the effect discriminatory practices had on the state's government-operated K-12 education.

References
  - Located at ProQuest

Notes

Further reading

External links
  - On the Internet Archive
2005 books
Books about Mississippi
History of African-American civil rights
University Press of Mississippi books